Lay-e Khorrami (also Romanized as Lāy-e Khorramī; also known as Lā-ye Khorramī) is a village in Khir Rural District, Runiz District, Estahban County, Fars Province, Iran. At the 2006 census, its population was 41, in 12 families.

References 

Populated places in Estahban County